Lady Lettice Mildred Mary Ashley-Cooper OStJ (12 February 1911 – 24 November 1990) was a British aristocrat, socialite, and airwoman. One of the Bright Young Things of the 1920s, she became a Flight Officer of the Women's Auxiliary Air Force during World War II.

Biography
Lady Lettice Mildred Mary Ashley-Cooper was born on 12 February 1911, the daughter of Anthony Ashley-Cooper, 9th Earl of Shaftesbury and Constance Sibell Grosvenor.

In 1936 her name was linked with the name of Edward VIII as a possible future wife; the King had declared that the future queen had to be "English, good, beautiful and a sportswoman", and the newspaper identified four names: Lady Anne Hope, daughter of the viceroy of India; Lady Mary Grosvenor, daughter of the Duke of Westminster; Lady Angela Montagu-Douglas-Scott, sister of the Duchess of Gloucester; and Lady Lettice Ashley-Cooper.

During World War II she was a Flight Officer of the Women's Auxiliary Air Force, promoted to Corporal in charge of the Orderly Room.

She was appointed Officer of the Most Venerable Order of the Hospital of St. John of Jerusalem (O.St.J.).

In 1974 she wrote Two 17th Century Dorset Inventories and in 1986 Unusual Behaviour, published with Gollancz.

References

1911 births
1990 deaths
English socialites
English women writers
Women's Auxiliary Air Force airwomen
Daughters of British earls
20th-century English women
20th-century English people